The Sporting Duchess may refer to:

 The Sporting Duchess (1915 film), a lost silent film drama
 The Sporting Duchess (1920 film), a lost American silent drama film
 The Sporting Duchess (play), 1895 play on which 1915 and 1920 films are based